The San Francisco Rush was a professional American rugby union team that played one season in the short-lived PRO Rugby competition. They were based in San Francisco, California, and played their home games at Boxer Stadium.

History
PRO Rugby announced its second team, San Francisco, on November 19, 2015. Paul Keeler was announced in December 2015 as San Francisco's head coach.

On December 15, 2016, PRO Rugby announced the immediate termination of the franchise due to a wide variety of issues, but mostly in regards to an unsuitable home venue and the inability to use Kezar Stadium.

Venue

Players and staff

2016 roster

The squad for the 2016 PRO Rugby season:

2016 coaching staff

Season summaries

Leading players

Coaches

See also
 Sports in the San Francisco Bay Area

References

Rugby clubs established in 2016
Sports teams in San Francisco
Defunct rugby union teams
2016 establishments in California
2016 disestablishments in California
Sports clubs disestablished in 2016
PRO Rugby teams